The Los Angeles Civic Light Opera (LACLO) was an American theatre/opera company in Los Angeles, California. Founded under the motto "Light Opera in the Grand Opera manner" in 1938 by impresario Edwin Lester, the organization presented fifty seasons of theatre before closing due to financial reasons in 1987. Typically the LACLO presented four to six productions during an annual season. The company produced or co-produced several of their own shows in addition to bringing in shows from Broadway to California, often with their original casts. Productions that originated at the LACLO and then went on to wider success, included Song of Norway (1944), Magdalena (1948), Kismet (1953), Peter Pan (1954) and Gigi (1973). Initially the organization mainly presented American operettas, but by the 1960s the company was presenting mostly musical theatre; although the company never completely left its roots.

History

The Los Angeles Civic Light Opera opened its first season in 1938 with the operetta Blossom Time, based on works by Franz Schubert, presented in English with stars John Charles Thomas and Francia White. The production was both a critical and financial success, and the company went on to have three more sold out productions that season with Sigmund Romberg's The Student Prince, Romberg's The New Moon, and Jerome Kern's Roberta.

At the time the LACLO opened, Broadway touring productions out of New York City did not travel further west than the Rocky Mountains. However, the success of the LACLO's first season drew the attention of the theatre community in New York City; seeing for the first time the financial potential of theatre in Los Angeles. Lester further encouraged this interest by partnering with San Francisco theatre impresario Homer Curran who founded the San Francisco Light Opera Company (SFLOC) in 1939. The LACLO and SFLOC joined forces and were able to offer New York producers the ability to book their shows in both L.A. and San Francisco. The Broadway producers took advantage of this opportunity and began extending their touring productions into California.

While including touring productions from NYC in their annual season, the LACLO still continued to mount their own locally produced productions under the artistic leadership of Lester. One major triumph for the company was the 1944 operetta Song of Norway which Lester commissioned Milton Lazarus, Robert Wright, and George Forrest to create using the music of Edvard Grieg. The production later went on to have a successful Broadway run. Wright and Forrest created several more original works for the LACLO, most notably the 1953 musical Kismet, which had an even greater success in New York. Perhaps the most successful original work to be produced at the LACLO was the 1954 musical version of Peter Pan which Lester orchestrated as a star vehicle for Mary Martin. After opening in Los Angeles, the production moved to Broadway, winning Martin a Tony Award. The LACLO also exported a number of revivals to Broadway during its history, including a 1945 revival of Victor Herbert's The Red Mill which ran for more than a year in New York.

During the 1950s and 1960s the LACLO was the most financially successful musical theatre subscription organization of its kind. However, in the 1970s the organization's audience size began to decrease and by the 1980s the company was experiencing serious financial difficulties. The company's last production was of John Kander's Cabaret in 1987. The production starred Joel Grey, Alyson Reed, Regina Resnik, Werner Klemperer, Gregg Edelman, and David Staller. Composer, conductor, and pianist Harper MacKay was the LACLO's music director from 1962 through 1980.

Performance history

References

Musical theatre companies
Opera companies in Los Angeles
Musical groups established in 1938
1938 establishments in California